Uzza is a monotypic genus of seed bugs in the tribe Drymini, erected by William Lucas Distant in 1909.  It contains the single species Uzza karenia from Thailand.

References

External links
 

Drymini